Ernest Allen Smith CBE was the 28th Auditor General of Ceylon. He was appointed on 16 February 1946, succeeding Oliver Ernest Goonetilleke, and held the office until 2 March 1953. He was succeeded by L. A. Weerasinghe.

He was appointed a Commander of the Order of the British Empire in the 1946 Birthday Honours.

References

Auditors General of Sri Lanka
Commanders of the Order of the British Empire